Arthur Smith (24 July 1887 – 23 October 1958) was a South African sports shooter. He competed in four events at the 1912 Summer Olympics.

References

1887 births
1958 deaths
South African male sport shooters
Olympic shooters of South Africa
Shooters at the 1912 Summer Olympics
Sportspeople from Inverness
Scottish emigrants to South Africa